Ezequias Emanuel Redín Morales (born 11 May 1995) is a Uruguayan footballer who plays as a midfielder for Plaza Colonia in the Uruguayan Primera División.

Career

Plaza Colonia
A graduate of the Plaza Colonia youth academy, Redín made his senior debut on 12 October 2013, coming on as an 85th-minute substitute for Nicolás Dibble in a 1–1 draw with Deportivo Maldonado.

Career statistics

Club

References

External links

1995 births
Living people
Plaza Colonia players
Uruguayan Primera División players
Uruguayan Segunda División players
Uruguayan footballers
Association football midfielders